Anup Ghatak (1941 – 26 September 2013) was an Indian cricketer. He played for Assam between 1963 and 1977. He was the first player to take 100 wickets for Assam in first-class cricket.

References

1941 births
2013 deaths
Indian cricketers
Assam cricketers